Walter John Reum (July 7, 1914–April 7, 1999) was an American lawyer, politician, and writer.

Reum was born in Chicago, Illinois. He went to the Austin Community Academy High School, University of Illinois, and Chicago-Kent College of Law. Reum was admitted to the Illinois bar in 1938 and practiced law in Chicago. He lived in Oak Park, Illinois with his wife and family. Reum served in the Illinois House of Representatives from 1953 to 1963 and was a Republican. Reum also wrote plays and poems. Reum died in Oak Park, Illinois from cancer.

Notes

External links

1914 births
1999 deaths
Politicians from Chicago
Lawyers from Chicago
Writers from Chicago
Writers from Oak Park, Illinois
University of Illinois alumni
Chicago-Kent College of Law alumni
Republican Party members of the Illinois House of Representatives
Deaths from cancer in Illinois
20th-century American politicians
20th-century American lawyers